The 56th World Science Fiction Convention (Worldcon), also known as BucConeer, was held on 5–9 August 1998 at the Baltimore Convention Center, the Baltimore Marriott Inner Harbor, the Holiday Inn Inner Harbor, the Omni Inner Harbor Baltimore (now the Wyndham), and the Baltimore Hilton and Towers in Baltimore, Maryland, United States.

The convention was chaired by Peggy Rae Pavlat.

Participants

Guests of Honor 

 C. J. Cherryh, author
 Milt Rothman, fan
 Stanley Schmidt, editor
 Michael Whelan, artist
 Charles Sheffield, toastmaster

Special Guest 

 J. Michael Straczynski

Program participants

Site selection 

Philadelphia, Pennsylvania won the vote for the 59th World Science Fiction Convention, to be held in 2001.

Awards

1998 Hugo Awards 

The winners were:

 Best Novel: Forever Peace, by Joe Haldeman
 Best Novella: "…Where Angels Fear to Tread", by Allen Steele (Asimov's, October/November 1997)
 Best Novelette: "We Will Drink a Fish Together…", by Bill Johnson (Asimov's, May 1997)
 Best Short Story: "The 43 Antarean Dynasties", by Mike Resnick (Asimov's, December 1997)
 Best Related Book: The Encyclopedia of Fantasy, by John Clute and John Grant
 Best Dramatic Presentation: Contact Best Professional Editor: Gardner Dozois
 Best Professional Artist: Bob Eggleton
 Best Semiprozine: Locus, edited by Charles N. Brown
 Best Fanzine: Mimosa'',  edited by Nicki Lynch and Richard Lynch
 Best Fan Writer: Dave Langford
 Best Fan Artist: Joe Mayhew

Other awards 

 John W. Campbell Award for Best New Writer: Mary Doria Russell

Committee 

 Convention Chair: Peggy Rae Pavlat

Division heads 

 Member Services: Michelle Smith-Moore
 Facilities: Marty Gear
 Programming: John Pomeranz
 Events: Kent Bloom
 Operations: Tom Veal
 "Contents of Tables": Kathryn Daugherty
 Exhibits: Barbara Lynn Higgins
 Public Relations: Sam Lubell
 "Strange Fannish Stuff": Marc Gordon

Bid 

 Chair: Hal Haag (1990–1991), Lance Oszko (1991–1993), Covert Beach (1993–1995)

Corporation 

 President: Covert Beach
 Vice-Presidents: Lance Oszko, Marty Gear
 Comptroller: Bob Macintosh
 Treasurer: Thomas Horman
 Recording Secretary: Thomas McMullan
 Corresponding Secretary: Jul Owings

See also 

 Hugo Award
 Science fiction
 Speculative fiction
 World Science Fiction Society
 Worldcon

References

External links 

 
 Convention site (not maintained)

1998 conferences
1998 in Maryland
1998 in the United States
Conventions in Baltimore
Conventions in Maryland
Science fiction conventions in the United States
Worldcon